Pioneer Seamount is an undersea mountain, or seamount, in the Pacific Ocean off the coast of central California.

Location

Physical characteristics

The seamount is a volcano between 10.9 and 11.1 million years old. Samples from the seamount consist of highly vesicular alkalic basalt, hawaiite, and mugearite.

The seamount and its volcano once extended above the sea surface, but eroded and sank as the seamount and the seabed at its base were carried further away from the spreading center from which it presumably originated.

Biological environment

A wide variety of sealife lives on the seamount. Corals dominate in deeper areas and sponges in its shallower parts.

Naming

Pioneer Seamount was named for USC&GS Pioneer, the first of three survey ships of the United States Coast and Geodetic Survey to bear the name. Pioneer operated along the United States West Coast and in the then-Territory of Alaska during her Coast and Geodetic Survey career, which lasted from 1922 to 1941.

Notes

References
 United States Geological Survey Monthly Newsletter Sound Waves: Fieldwork: Geologists and Biologists Endeavor to Understand Seamount Environments Off California
 NOAA History: Tools of the Trade: Coast and Geodetic Survey Ships: Pioneer

Seamounts of the Pacific Ocean